Crawfordsville Community School Corporation (CCSC), also known as Crawfordsville Community Schools, is a school district headquartered in Crawfordsville, Indiana.

Schools
Secondary schools:
Crawfordsville High School
Crawfordsville Middle School
Elementary schools:
Hose Elementary School
Hoover Elementary School
Nicholson Elementary School

See also
Montgomery County school districts:
 North Montgomery School Corporation
 South Montgomery Community School Corporation

References

External links
Crawfordsville Community School Corporation

Education in Montgomery County, Indiana
School districts in Indiana